William Labov (born December 4, 1927) is an American linguist widely regarded as the founder of the discipline of variationist sociolinguistics. He has been described as "an enormously original and influential figure who has created much of the methodology" of sociolinguistics. He is a professor emeritus in the linguistics department of the University of Pennsylvania and pursues research in sociolinguistics, language change, and dialectology. He retired in 2015 but continues to publish research.

Biography
Born in Rutherford, New Jersey, Labov majored in English and philosophy and studied chemistry at Harvard (1948). He worked as an industrial chemist in his family’s business (1949–61) before turning to linguistics. For his MA thesis (1963) he completed a study of change in the dialect of Martha's Vineyard, which he presented before the Linguistic Society of America. Labov took his PhD (1964) at Columbia University studying under Uriel Weinreich. He was an assistant professor of linguistics at Columbia (1964–70) before becoming an associate professor at the University of Pennsylvania in 1971, then a full professor, and in 1976 becoming director of the university's Linguistics Laboratory.

The five children of his first marriage to Teresa Gnasso Labov are Susannah Page, Sarah Labov, Simon Labov, Joanna Labov and Jessie Labov. He has been married to fellow sociolinguist Gillian Sankoff since 1993. They have two children, Rebecca Labov and sociologist Alice Goffman.

Work

The methods he used to collect data for his study of the varieties of English spoken in New York City, published as The Social Stratification of English in New York City (1966), have been influential in social dialectology. In the late 1960s and early 1970s, his studies of the linguistic features of African American Vernacular English (AAVE) were also influential: he argued that AAVE should not be stigmatized as substandard, but rather respected as a variety of English with its own grammatical rules. He has also pursued research in referential indeterminacy and is noted for his seminal studies of the way ordinary people structure narrative stories of their own lives. In addition, several of his classes are service-based, with students going to West Philadelphia to help tutor young children while simultaneously learning linguistics from different dialects such as AAVE.

More recently he has studied ongoing changes in the phonology of English as spoken in the United States, as well as the origins and patterns of chain shifts of vowels (one sound replacing a second, replacing a third, in a complete chain). In the Atlas of North American English (2006), he and his co-authors find three major divergent chain shifts taking place today: a Southern Shift (in Appalachia and southern coastal regions); a Northern Cities Vowel Shift affecting a region from Madison, Wisconsin, east to Utica, New York; and a Canadian Shift affecting most of Canada, as well as some areas in the Western and Midwestern (Midland) United States, in addition to several minor chain shifts in smaller regions.

Among Labov's well-known students are Charles Boberg, Anne H. Charity Hudley, Penelope Eckert, Gregory Guy, Robert A. Leonard, Geoffrey Nunberg, Shana Poplack, and John R. Rickford. His methods were adopted in England by Peter Trudgill for Norwich speech and K. M. Petyt for West Yorkshire speech.

Labov's works include The Study of Nonstandard English (1969), Language in the Inner City: Studies in Black English Vernacular (1972), Sociolinguistic Patterns (1972), Principles of Linguistic Change (vol.I Internal Factors, 1994; vol.II Social Factors, 2001, vol.III Cognitive and Cultural factors, 2010), and, with Sharon Ash and Charles Boberg, The Atlas of North American English (2006).

Labov was awarded the 2013 Benjamin Franklin Medal in Computer and Cognitive Science by the Franklin Institute with the citation "[f]or establishing the cognitive basis of language variation and change through rigorous analysis of linguistic data, and for the study of non-standard dialects with significant social and cultural implications."

Language in use

In "Narrative Analysis: Oral Versions of Personal Experience", Labov and Joshua Waletzky take a sociolinguistic approach to examine how language works between people. This is significant because it contextualizes the study of structure and form, connecting purpose to method. His stated purpose is to "isolate the elements of narrative". This work focuses exclusively on oral narratives.

Labov describes narrative as having two functions: referential and evaluative, with its referential functions orienting and grounding a story in its contextual world by referencing events in sequential order as they originally occurred, and its evaluative functions describing the storyteller's purpose in telling the story. Formally analyzing data from orally generated texts obtained via observed group interaction and interview (600 interviews were taken from several studies whose participants included ethnically diverse groups of children and adults from various backgrounds), Labov divides narrative into five or six sections:

 Abstract – gives an overview of the story.
 Orientation – Labov describes this as "referential [free clauses that] serve to orient the listener in respect to person, place, time, and behavioral situation". He specifies that these are contextual clues that precede the main story.
 Complication – the main story, during which the narrative unfolds. A story may consist of multiple complication sections.
 Evaluation – author evinces self-awareness, giving explicit or implicit purpose to the retelling of the story. Thus evaluation gives some indication of the significance the author attributes to their story. But evaluation can be done subtly: for instance, "lexical intensifiers [are a type of] semantically defined evaluation".
 Resolution – occurs sequentially following the evaluation. The resolution may give the story a sense of completion.
 Coda – returns listener to the present, drawing them back out of the world of the story into the world of the storytelling event. A coda is not essential to a narrative, and some narratives do not have one.

While not every narrative includes all these elements, the purpose of this subdivision is to show that narratives have inherent structural order. Labov argues that narrative units must retell events in the order they were experienced because narrative is temporally sequenced. In other words, events do not occur at random but are connected to one another; thus "the original semantic interpretation" depends on their original order. To demonstrate this sequence, he breaks a story down into its basic parts. He defines narrative clause as the "basic unit of narrative" around which everything else is built. Clauses can be distinguished from one another by temporal junctures, which indicate a shift in time and separate narrative clauses. Temporal junctures mark temporal sequencing because clauses cannot be rearranged without disrupting their meaning.

Labov and Waletzky's findings are important because they derived them from actual data rather than abstract theorization. Labov, Waletzky, &c., set up interviews and documented speech patterns in storytelling, keeping with the ethnographic tradition of tape-recording oral text so it can be referenced exactly. This inductive method creates a new system through which to understand story text.

Golden Age Principle
One of Labov's most quoted contributions to theories of language change is his Golden Age Principle (or Golden Age Theory). It claims that any changes in the sounds or the grammar that have come to conscious awareness in a speech community trigger a uniformly negative reaction.

Scholarly influence and criticism

Labov's seminal work has been referenced and critically examined by a number of scholars, mainly for its structural rigidity. Kristin Langellier explains that "the purpose of Labovian analysis is to relate the formal properties of the narrative to their functions": clause-level analysis of how text affects transmission of message. This model has several flaws, which Langellier points out: it examines textual structure to the exclusion of context and audience, which often act to shape a text in real time; it's relevant to a specific demographic (may be difficult to extrapolate); and, by categorizing the text at a clausal level, it burdens analysis with theoretical distinctions that may not be illuminating in practice. Anna De Fina remarks that [within Labov's model] "the defining property of narrative is temporal sequence, since the order in which the events are presented in the narrative is expected to match the original events as they occurred", which differs from more contemporary notions of storytelling, in which a naturally time-conscious flow includes jumping forward and back in time as mandated by, for example, anxieties felt about futures and their interplay with subsequent decisions. De Fina and Langellier both note that, though wonderfully descriptive, Labov's model is nevertheless difficult to code, thus potentially limited in application/practice. De Fina also agrees with Langellier that Labov's model ignores the complex and often quite relevant subject of intertextuality in narrative. To an extent, Labov evinces awareness of these concerns, saying "it is clear that these conclusions are restricted to the speech communities that we have examined", and "the overall structure of the narratives we've examined is not uniform". In "Rethinking Ventriloquism," Diane Goldstein uses Labovian notions of tellability—internal coherence in narrative—to inform her concept of untellability.

Honors
In 1968 Labov received the David H. Russell Award for Distinguished Research in Teaching English.

He was a Guggenheim Fellow in 1970-71 and 1987-88.

Labov has received honorary doctorates from, among others, the Faculty of Humanities at Uppsala University (1985) and University of Edinburgh (2005).

In 1996, he won the Leonard Bloomfield Book Award from the Linguistic Society of America (LSA) for Principles of Linguistic Change, Vol. 1.; he won the Award again in 2008 as a coauthor of the Atlas of North American English.

In 2013 Labov received a Franklin Institute Award in Computer and Cognitive Science for "establishing the cognitive basis of language variation and change through rigorous analysis of linguistic data, and for the study of non-standard dialects with significant social and cultural implications."

In 2015 he was awarded the Neil and Saras Smith Medal for Linguistics by the British Academy "for lifetime achievement in the scholarly study of linguistics" and "his significant contribution to linguistics and the language sciences".

In 2020, Labov was awarded the American Academy of Arts and Sciences' Talcott Parsons Prize, recognizing "distinguished and original contributions to the social sciences".

References

External links

 William Labov's home page
 Journal of English Linguistics interview 
 NPR story "American Accent Undergoing Great Vowel Shift"
 Sociolinguistics: an interview with William Labov  ReVEL, vol. 5, n. 9, 2007.

1927 births
Living people
Linguists from the United States
Sociolinguists
Dialectologists
Harvard College alumni
Columbia University alumni
University of Pennsylvania faculty
Columbia University faculty
Jewish American scientists
Members of the United States National Academy of Sciences
Fellows of the American Academy of Arts and Sciences
Fellows of the American Association for the Advancement of Science
People from Rutherford, New Jersey
20th-century linguists
21st-century linguists
Fellows of the Cognitive Science Society
Recipients of the Neil and Saras Smith Medal for Linguistics
Linguistic Society of America presidents
21st-century American Jews
Fellows of the Linguistic Society of America